Greg Mueller (born June 2, 1971) is a German and Canadian professional poker player and former professional ice hockey defenceman.

Mueller was born in Schaffhausen, Switzerland. He began playing professional ice hockey in 1992 and played his entire career in Germany, playing the Eishockey-Bundesliga for EC Hedos München and the Deutsche Eishockey Liga for Maddogs München and Ratinger Löwen.

Mueller was drawn to poker after one of many long road trips during his hockey career. After retiring from hockey, he decided to take the game more seriously and began playing in tournaments. Since then, Mueller has cashed in many poker tournaments throughout his poker career.

Mueller won his first World Series of Poker title in 2009 in the $10,000 limit Texas hold'em championship.  Mueller won his second World Series of Poker bracelet and $194,909 only 11 days after his first in a $1,500 Limit Hold'em Shootout event.  He won his third in the $10,000 H.O.R.S.E. championship at the 2019 WSOP.

His best showing in the World Poker Tour was a fourth-place finish in the 2006 World Poker Challenge, where he won $142,285.

As of 2019, his total live tournament winnings exceed $3,350,000. His 43 cashes at the WSOP account for over $2,400,000 of those winnings.

World Series of Poker Bracelets

Notes

External links

Canadian poker players
German poker players
Living people
World Series of Poker bracelet winners
Canadian ice hockey defencemen
German ice hockey players
Mad Dogs München players
EC Ratinger Löwen players
Hannover EC players
Füchse Duisburg players
People from Schaffhausen
Sportspeople from the canton of Schaffhausen
Canadian expatriate ice hockey players in Germany
Year of birth missing (living people)